Precious Gondwe is a Botswana based lawyer and businesswoman. She was named in the Top 30 Most Influential Female Lawyers in Africa wherein she represented the Republic of Botswana as a lawyer and a Law firm founder in Africa.

Background
Born in 1987 in Bulawayo, Zimbabwe, Precious Gondwe was born in the city of Bulawayo in Zimbabwe and was raised in Botswana where she had her early education. She proceeded to study law at University of South Africa in Pretoria.

Career
Precious Gondwe started her career in 2012 at Lerumo Mogobe Legal Practitioners. In 2018 she established her own firm Precious & Partners in Botswana. Over ten years she has gained recognition as one of the prominent legal practitioners in Southern Africa.

Awards
In 2020 she was recognized in the top five Southern African Women in Leadership (SAWIL) where she was awarded and named in the Top 10 Category of Trailblazers, Southern African Women in Leadership. She was then awarded a Humanitarian Award by the Young Boss Media New York the same year. In 2021, from The Vessels Awards, Precious was given the Pan African Leader and social Entrepreneur of year awards. In 2021 Precious Gondwe sat on the board of Pembury Lifestyle Group.

References

External links

Botswana women in business
Botswana lawyers
1987 births
Living people
Botswana company founders
People from Bulawayo
University of South Africa alumni